Pedro Felipe Ramírez Ceballos (born 19 October 1941) is a Chilean politician who has served as deputy, minister of Salvador Allende and ambassador of his country in Venezuela.

Biography

Personal life
He is openly gay, assuming his homosexuality while in exile in Venezuela. In 1984, after returning to Chile, the National Information Center (CNI) threatened to publish evidence that would reveal his homosexuality, strongly rejected by society at the time. Although Ramírez and the rest of the Christian Left Party were not certain that the intelligence agencies of the dictatorship had this evidence, they preferred to avoid publicizing the situation. Thus, Ramírez left the general secretariat, being replaced by Luis Maira, and left the most relevant political positions.

References

External links
 Profile at BCN

1941 births
Living people
People from Talca
Chilean people of Spanish descent
Chilean Roman Catholics
Christian Democratic Party (Chile) politicians
Christian Left (Chile) politicians
Party for Democracy (Chile) politicians
Citizen Left politicians
Government ministers of Chile
Deputies of the XLVI Legislative Period of the National Congress of Chile
Ambassadors of Chile to Venezuela
Chilean LGBT politicians
Chilean gay men
Chilean engineers
University of Chile alumni